Lukáš Kubus (born 15 May 1988) is a Slovak football forward who currently plays for ASV Kottingbrunn.

Club career

1. FC Tatran Prešov
Kubus made his professional Fortuna Liga debut for 1. FC Tatran Prešov against MFK Zemplín Michalovce on 24 July 2016.

References

External links
 
 
 Eurofotbal profile
 Futbalnet profile

1988 births
Living people
Slovak footballers
Association football forwards
FK Poprad players
MFK Tatran Liptovský Mikuláš players
Wisła Płock players
1. FC Tatran Prešov players
FK Spišská Nová Ves players
Slovak Super Liga players
Expatriate footballers in Poland
Sportspeople from Poprad